Anand Madhusoodanan is an Indian film score composer and screenwriter who is known for his works in Malayalam cinema.

Filmography

References

External links
 

Malayalam film score composers
Living people
Film musicians from Kerala
1988 births